The Houston Astros' 1989 season in American baseball involved the Houston Astros attempting to win the National League West. The season was best remembered for the Astros winning 16 of 17 games in late May through mid June.

Offseason
 December 4, 1988: The Astros traded a player to be named later to the Minnesota Twins for Mark Portugal. The Astros completed the deal by sending Todd McClure (minors) to the Twins on December 7.
 December 21, 1988: Bob Forsch was signed as a free agent by the Astros.
 January 10, 1989: John Fishel, Mike Hook (minors), and Pedro DeLeon (minors) were traded by the Astros to the New York Yankees for Rick Rhoden.
 January 30, 1989: Dan Schatzeder was signed as a free agent by the Astros.
 February 16, 1989: Roger Mason was signed as a free agent with the Houston Astros.
 March 31, 1989: Dave Johnson and Victor Hithe (minors) were traded by the Astros to the Baltimore Orioles for Carl Nichols.

Regular season

Standings

Record vs. opponents

Notable transactions
 April 5, 1989: Greg Gross was signed as a free agent with the Houston Astros.
 April 6, 1989: Troy Afenir was traded by the Astros to the Oakland Athletics for Matt Sinatro.
 June 5, 1989: Jeff Juden was drafted by the Astros in the 1st round (12th pick) of the 1989 Major League Baseball draft. Player signed June 30, 1989.

Roster

Player stats

Batting

Starters by position
Note: Pos = Position; G = Games played; AB = At bats; H = Hits; Avg. = Batting average; HR = Home runs; RBI = Runs batted in

Other batters
Note: G = Games played; AB = At bats; H = Hits; Avg. = Batting average; HR = Home runs; RBI = Runs batted in

Pitching

Starting pitchers
Note: G = Games pitched; IP = Innings pitched; W = Wins; L = Losses; ERA = Earned run average; SO = Strikeouts

Other pitchers
Note: G = Games pitched; IP = Innings pitched; W = Wins; L = Losses; ERA = Earned run average; SO = Strikeouts

Relief pitchers
Note: G = Games pitched; W = Wins; L = Losses; SV = Saves; ERA = Earned run average; SO = Strikeouts

Farm system

References

External links
1989 Houston Astros season at Baseball Reference

Houston Astros seasons
Houston Astros season
Houston